Black Like Me, first published in 1961, is a nonfiction book by journalist John Howard Griffin recounting his journey in the Deep South of the United States, at a time when African-Americans lived under racial segregation. Griffin was a native of Mansfield, Texas, who had his skin temporarily darkened to pass as a black man. He traveled for six weeks throughout the racially segregated states of Louisiana, Mississippi, Alabama, Arkansas, and Georgia to explore life from the other side of the color line. Sepia Magazine financed the project in exchange for the right to print the account first as a series of articles.

Griffin kept a journal of his experiences; the 188-page diary was the genesis of the book. When he started his project in 1959, race relations in America were particularly strained. The title of the book is taken from the last line of the Langston Hughes poem "Dream Variations".

In 1964, a film version of Black Like Me, starring James Whitmore, was produced. A generation later, Robert Bonazzi published a biographical book about Griffin, these events, and his life: Man in the Mirror: John Howard Griffin and the Story of Black Like Me (1997).

Account of the trip

In late 1959, John Howard Griffin went to a friend's house in New Orleans, Louisiana. Once there, under the care of a dermatologist, Griffin underwent a regimen of large oral doses of the anti-vitiligo drug methoxsalen, and spent up to 15 hours daily under an ultraviolet lamp for about a week. He was given regular blood tests to ensure that he was not suffering liver damage. The darkening of his skin was not perfect, so he touched it up with stain. He shaved his head bald to hide his straight brown hair. Satisfied that he could pass as an African-American, Griffin began a six-week journey in the South. Don Rutledge traveled with him, documenting the experience with photos.

During his trip, Griffin abided by the rule that he would not change his name or alter his identity; if asked who he was or what he was doing, he would tell the truth. In the beginning, he decided to talk as little as possible to ease his transition into the social milieu of southern U.S. blacks. He became accustomed everywhere to the "hate stare" received from whites.

After he disguised himself, many people who knew Griffin as a white man did not recognize him. Sterling Williams, a black shoeshine man in the French Quarter whom Griffin regarded as a casual friend, did not recognize him. He first hinted that he wore the same unusual shoes as somebody else, but Sterling still did not recognize him until Griffin told him. Because Griffin wanted assistance in entering into the black community, he decided to tell Williams about his identity and project.

In New Orleans, a black counterman at a small restaurant chatted with Griffin about the difficulties of finding a place to go to the bathroom, as facilities were segregated and blacks were prohibited from many. He turned a question about a Catholic church into a joke about "spending much of your time praying for a place to piss".

On a bus trip, Griffin began to give his seat to a white woman, but disapproving looks from black passengers stopped him. He thought he had a momentary breakthrough with the woman, but she insulted him and began talking with other white passengers about how impudent the blacks were becoming.

Griffin decided to end his journey in late November in Montgomery, Alabama. He spent three days secluded from sunlight in a hotel room and stopped taking his skin-darkening medication. When his skin had regained its natural color, he quietly slipped into the white part of Montgomery, and was jarred by how warmly the people there now treated him.

Reaction

After his book was published, Griffin received many letters of support. He said they helped him understand the experience. Griffin received very few hostile letters.

Griffin became a national celebrity for a time. In a 1975 essay included in later editions of the book, he recounted encountering hostility and threats to him and his family in his hometown of Mansfield, Texas. He moved to Mexico for a number of years for safety.

In 1964, while stopped with a flat tire in Mississippi, Griffin was assaulted by a group of white men and beaten with chains, an assault attributed to the book. It took five months to recover from the injuries.

Precedent
Journalist Ray Sprigle of the Pittsburgh Post-Gazette had undertaken a similar project more than a decade earlier. In May 1948, Sprigle disguised himself as a black man and traveled in the Deep South for a month with black Atlanta political and social leader John Wesley Dobbs, a guide provided by the NAACP. In August Sprigle wrote a series of 21 articles under the title "I Was a Negro in the South for 30 Days," which was syndicated in 14 newspapers including the New York Herald Tribune. Sprigle's newspaper articles formed the basis of his 1949 book In the Land of Jim Crow. Bill Steigerwald goes into great detail about Sprigle's undercover trip and the impact his series had on the country in his 2017 book 30 Days a Black Man.

Publication history 
Sepia Magazine financed the project in exchange for the right to print the account first as a series of articles, which it did under the title Journey into Shame.

United States 
 
 
 
 2nd Edition, with an epilogue by the author, written three years before his death in 1980.
 
 With an epilogue by the author and a new afterword by Robert Bonazzi. Library-bound printing is 
 
 
 
 New edition. With a foreword by Studs Terkel, historic photographs by Don Rutledge, and an afterword by Robert Bonazzi. Library-bound printing is

UK 
 
 
  (repeatedly reprinted under same ISBN)

Cultural references
The title of the song "Black Like Me" (2020) by Mickey Guyton was inspired by the book.

The television drama film To Be Fat like Me (2007) was loosely inspired by the book. It stars Kaley Cuoco as a thin woman who makes herself appear overweight by wearing a fat suit, and films her experiences for a documentary titled Fat Like Me.

See also 
 Civil Rights Movement
 Grace Halsell, a white investigative reporter who lived for a time as a black woman and wrote the book Soul Sister (1969) about her experience.
 Lowest of the Low (German: Ganz unten), a similar book about Turks in Germany written by Günter Wallraff
 The Negro Motorist Green Book, a guide for African-American travelers published annually 1936–1966
 Timeline of the civil rights movement

Citations

General and cited references

External links 
 "John Howard Griffin Took Race All the Way to the Finish"—The Washington Post
 "Dream Variations" by Langston Hughes

1961 non-fiction books
Anti-black racism in the United States
Autobiographies adapted into films
Culture of the Southern United States
Houghton Mifflin books
Non-fiction books about racism
Qualitative research
Travel autobiographies